Zyzzyx is a monospecific genus of sand wasp, containing a brightly coloured, medium-sized species, Zyzzyx chilensis. It is primarily a predator on flies, but has been observed to consume skippers. "Zyzzyx" is a replacement name proposed in 1937 by V. S. L. Pate for Therapon, originally described by J. Parker in 1929.

Z. chilensis is found in Chile, Peru, and Argentina.

References 

Crabronidae
Apoidea genera
Biological pest control wasps
Monotypic Hymenoptera genera
Hymenoptera of South America